LAB – Linhas Aéreas Brasileiras S.A. was a Brazilian airline founded in 1945. It ceased operations in 1948.

History
LAB was founded on July 14, 1945 in Belém. Flights started on December 8, 1945 linking Rio de Janeiro with Salvador da Bahia via the coast. Later, the route was extended to São Paulo and cities in the northwestern part of Minas Gerais. It however had problems to maintain regularity and offered bad working conditions for its employees. It ceased operations in 1948.

Destinations
Some of the cities served by LAB were:
Rio de Janeiro – Santos Dumont Airport
Salvador da Bahia – 2 de Julho International Airport
São Paulo – Congonhas Airport

Fleet

See also

List of defunct airlines of Brazil

References

External links
LAB accidents as per Aviation Safety Database

Defunct airlines of Brazil
Airlines established in 1945
Airlines disestablished in 1948